The hospital, originally named after the philanthropist Robert Mitford of the civil service, who served many years in Dhaka as collector and later, as judge of the Provincial Court of Appeal, was the most important medical institution, not only in Dhaka, but in the whole of Eastern Bengal and Assam in the mid-19th century. Robert Mitford died in Europe in 1836, but before his death he bequeathed the bulk of his property (about eight lakh rupees) to the Government of Bengal for public works in Dhaka. This was, however, disputed by his successors in England and finally the Chancery Court partially decreed in favor of the Bengal Government in 1850. With Mitford's benevolent gift, the construction of this hospital was started in 1854 on its present site, which was then known as Babu Bazar. Prior to this, the site was earlier occupied by a Dutch kuthi.

History 

In 1887 a European ward (in patient department) was established in the hospital. The hospital, in addition to the main wards, accommodated lecture halls, dissecting rooms, an out-patients department and a European ward for in-patients. A medical school attached to the hospital was built in 1875. The present building was erected in 1889 which was mainly raised through private subscriptions. It accommodated two lecture halls, two separate dissecting rooms one for males and one for females, a laboratory, gymnasium and a hostel was added later.

Architectural value 

Occupying an oblong area of about 12.8 acres of land on the river bank, the hospital complex comprises more than fourteen different blocks of no particular architectural significance but historically important and eminently of utilitarian character. Most of these blocks, built at different times in the last hundred years or more, and which originally were single-storeyed, have now been raised to four storeys.

The Medical College block is a fairly handsome large building located at the south-eastern corner near the river bank with an attractive large garden in front. It was originally erected in 1889, toughly in the shape on English ‘H’ with two symmetrical projections in the middle on the north and the south, one accommodating a verandah and the other, a staircase. It presents a 225’-0” long frontage to the north. Its foundation stone was laid by W.A. Larminie, M.I.C.S., commissioner of the Dhaka division, on 2 April 1887.
Originally a single-storeyed building, three more storeys have now been added in the same style, together with a staircase In the middle of the projected southern side. A 15’-0” wide verandah in front of the building is carried on a series of semi-circular arches with prominent key-stones, alternated by dwarf rectangular brick pillars. A short wing on the west accommodates the principal's two chambers. Abutting these on the east is a large lecture hall measuring 50’-0” X 30’-0” with a 10’-0” wide verandah on the south and a corridor on the east. Across the corridor and further to the east is another large lecture hall and beyond that are two more halls. The most eastern wing has another large hall measuring 50’-0” x 25’-0”. Corresponding to the western bay the eastern wing also has two apartments.

The Ahsanullah Ward, consisting of a group of old buildings across a lane on the west, has now been pulled down to accommodate a modern eleven-storeyed building. To its north is the Lady Duffering Ward, a 135’-0” long east-west running block facing north, the Hare Ward which is 142’-0” long and the Manmatha Nath Ward. Further to the west, away from the river bank is the lady student's hostel which is 120’-0” X 55’-0” and the larger nurses home block measuring 180’-0” X 80’-0”.

The King Edward Memorial Ward which measures 328’-0” X 80’-0’ is an impressive three-storeyed building with a 40’-0” broad projecting portico which is located to the north of the nurses’ home. At its east and west ends the building is relieved with two semi-octagonal turrets, carrying a round kiosk on top with projected eaves. Two domes, crowning the terminal bays, further relieve the skyline. The porch leads to a foyer through a cloister. A marble plaque, on the entrance wall, depicts the portrait of King Edward VII to whom the building was dedicated. A staircase located in the right corner of the foyer leads to the upper storey. On either side of the covered corridor are a set of apartments which are used for a variety of purposes. The foyer gives access to two symmetrical wings on the east and west, each of which accommodate two large halls and a set of smaller apartments. This block was formally opened by John Lumley Dundas, Earl of Ranaldshay, G.C.I.E. and Governor of Bengal on 19 August 1920.
The Administrative block in front of the Edward Memorial Ward is a plain three-storeyed building connected by a covered passage. The residential medical officer's quarters, now operating as the blood bank, is a simple two-storied building situated to the north of the main hospital. The labour ward, a single-storeyed 70’-0” long building, which was erected by Zamindar Revati Mohan Das Bahadur, is located to the north of the Ahsanullah Ward. The Prem Chand Roy Ward and the Johnson Wards are behind the main Hospital block. In front of the hospital and adjoin the city-road is the Eye Infirmary building with was erected in 1893 by raja Srinath Roy Chaudhury of Bhaggyakul in memory of his mother Subhadra Moni Chaudhruy. Other minor blocks of buildings within the premises, such as the resident medical officer's quarters, the rankin Outdoor Dispensary, the European ward, Johnson Ward and the civil surgeons’ office are scattered around the compound.

The nucleus of this institution of great public utility, established over a century back was the generous gift of Mitford, after whom it was originally named. It has now been renamed after Nawab Salimullah Bahadur in the 1960s and has developed and expanded with the time and with the donations of a number of public-spirited luminaries of Dhaka, after whom several isolated block of buildings have been dedicated. However, it is a great pity that the name of the original patron, Robert Mitford who bequeathed a substantial part of his life's savings for the founding of this institution has now been completely forgotten and not a single block of the existing buildings has been allowed to cherish his memory.

References 

 Ahmed, Nazimuddin, Buildings of the British Raj in Bangladesh, Edited by John Sanday, University Press Limited, 1st Edition, Page no. 46–49, ISBN No: 9840510916
 Mamun, Muntasir, Dhaka: Smriti Bismritir Nagari, 3rd Edition, Page No: 201-206, ISBN No: 984 412 1043
 Banglapedia: Mitford Hospital

Further reading 
 Sharif Uddin Ahmed, Mitford Hospital and Dhaka Medical School – History and Heritage,1858-1947 (in Bengali ), Academic Press and Publishers Limited, Dhaka, 2007.

Old Dhaka
Hospitals in Dhaka
Hospital buildings completed in 1889
1854 establishments in India